Agnolin is a surname. Notable people with the surname include:

 Luciano Agnolín (1915–1986), Argentine footballer
 Luigi Agnolin (1943–2018), Italian football referee

See also
 Agnoli

Italian-language surnames